The Metagoniolithoideae are a monogeneric subfamily of genucilate Corallinaceaen coralline algae.

References

Bikont subfamilies
Corallinaceae